is a railway station in the city of  Tajimi, Gifu Prefecture, Japan, operated by Central Japan Railway Company (JR Tōkai).

Lines
It is also the terminal station for the Taita Line.

Layout
The station has one ground level side platform and two ground-level  island platforms, with an elevated station building located above the tracks and platforms. The station has a Midori no Madoguchi staffed ticket office.

Platforms

At times there are deviations from the description above.

Adjacent stations

|-
!colspan=5|JR Central

History
Tajimi Station was opened on 25 July 1900.  On 1 April 1987, it became part of JR Tōkai. A new station building was completed in November 2009.

Passenger statistics
In fiscal 2015, the station was used by an average of 13,688 passengers daily (boarding passengers only).

Surrounding area
Shōnai River

See also
 List of Railway Stations in Japan

References

External links

  

Railway stations in Japan opened in 1900
Railway stations in Gifu Prefecture
Stations of Central Japan Railway Company
Chūō Main Line
Taita Line
Station, Tajimi